Irish Mythen is an Irish-born Canadian contemporary folk singer-songwriter. In recent years, Mythen has performed with Rod Stewart, Gordon Lightfoot and Lucinda Williams at major festival stages the world over.
Mythen's first two full-length albums were Sweet Necessity in 2008 and Open Here in 2011. She moved to Prince Edward Island in 2007, where she won the Songwriter of the Year Award in 2016 for her song 'Gypsy Dancer'. Her third album, released in 2014 titled Irish Mythen, won the East Coast Music Association 2015 Roots Album of the Year. Mythen is described as "rambunctious, thoughtful, tender and loud" by ABC Radio National. She was one of several female artists at the 2018 edition of the legendary Cambridge Folk Festival, who were singled out by the Guardian newspaper in their praise of new (since 2017) festival booker Bev Burton's female-heavy line-up for the festival. Australia's premier folk and roots festival Byron Bay Bluesfest call her a 'must see artist' and she is booked to make a third appearance at the festival in 2019.

Her album “Little Bones” received a Juno Award nomination for Contemporary Roots Album of the Year at the Juno Awards of 2020, and won the Canadian Folk Music Award for Solo Artist of the Year at the 15th Canadian Folk Music Awards.

References

External links 
 Official website

Year of birth missing (living people)
Living people
Canadian people of Irish descent
Canadian women singer-songwriters
Canadian folk singer-songwriters
Musicians from Prince Edward Island
Canadian Folk Music Award winners